Chaeteessa is a genus of mantis. It is the only extant member of the family Chaeteessidae, the most primitive lineage of living mantises. It contains six species found in South America:

Species 
Chaeteessa burmeisteri
Chaeteessa caudata
Chaeteessa filata
Chaeteessa nana
Chaeteessa nigromarginata
Chaeteessa valida

Notelist

References

Mantodea genera
Taxa named by Hermann Burmeister